This article lists events that occurred during 1991 in Estonia.

Incumbents

Events
 3 March – 1991 Estonian independence referendum.
 Latvia and Estonia voted for independence from the Soviet Union.
 The United States recognized the independence of Estonia, Latvia and Lithuania.
 20 August – The Supreme Soviet of the Estonian SSR recognized Estonian independence from the Soviet Union.
 22 August – Iceland is the first state to recognize the independent Republic of Estonia.
 29 August – Sweden is the first country which opens an embassy in Estonia.
 6 September – The Soviet Union recognized the independence of the Baltic States.

Births
25 June - Liisi Rist, racing cyclist

Deaths

See also
 1991 in Estonian football
 1991 in Estonian television

References

 
1990s in Estonia
Estonia
Estonia
Years of the 20th century in Estonia